Alucita xanthozona is a moth of the family Alucitidae. It was described by Clarke in 1986. It is found on the Marquesas Archipelago.

Taxonomy
The name xanthozona is preoccupied by Diakonoff's species Alucita xanthozona and in need of renaming.

References

Moths described in 1986
Alucitidae
Moths of Oceania